Cathyalia fulvella is a species of snout moth in the genus Cathyalia. It was described by Émile Louis Ragonot in 1888. It is found in Australia.

The larvae have been recorded feeding on mango.

References

Moths described in 1888
Phycitini
Taxa named by Émile Louis Ragonot